Aleksandr Korzun (born 13 July 2000) is a Belarusian professional footballer who plays for Molodechno.

References

External links 
 
 

2000 births
Living people
Belarusian footballers
Association football forwards
FC Isloch Minsk Raion players
FC Slonim-2017 players
FC Orsha players
FC Molodechno players